Vladimir Velichkov (born 24 May 1959) is a Bulgarian former biathlete. He was among the best biathletes during the 1980s and he is generally recognised as the greatest male Bulgarian biathlete of all time.

Life and career
Born in the village of Stambolovo in the southwestern part of Bulgaria, Velichkov started his active sports career in sixth grade, when he joined the local cross-country skiing club. He later switched to biathlon. Velichkov participated in his first Olympics in 1980 and he debuted at the World Championship-level at the World Championships in Minsk in 1982. He also participated in the Olympics in 1984 and 1988 and the World Championships in 1983, 1985, 1986, 1987, 1989 and 1990 for Bulgaria. His best individual finish at the Olympics came in the 20 km individual in 1984, he finished 13th. His best, and only, relay finish came in 1988, an 8th place. His best individual finish at the World Championships came in 1982 in Minsk where Velichkov finished 5th, a feat he copied three years later in Ruhpolding, both in the sprint. His best relay finish at the World Championships was a 10th which came in 1989 in Feistritz, where his best, and only, team event finish also came, a 12th place.

In the World Cup, Velichkov debuted in the first round of the 1979–80 World Cup in Ruhpolding in West Germany. Over his career he finished twice on the podium. Both came in Murmansk in the last round of his debut season, a second place in the 20 km individual and a third in the 10 km sprint. These podium finishes were the first for a Bulgarian biathlete, and, as of the end of the 2014–15 season, the last by a male Bulgarian biathlete. He also finished in the top ten in multiple other races. These finishes were not matched by any other male Bulgarian biathlete but his contemporary Spas Slatev until the 2014–15 season, where Krasimir Anev finished 4th in a mass start race in Oberhof, and Vladimir Iliev finished 6th twice during the 2015 World Championships in Kontiolahti. Velichkov was a part of the relay team that finished 6th in the World Cup race in Ruhpolding in 1988, which is still the best relay finish by a male Bulgarian relay team. Velichkov's best overall finish came in the 1981–82 World Cup where he finished 9th, the best overall finish by any male Bulgarian biathlete.

Velichkov retired as an athlete after the 1989–90 season. After his retirement from professional sports, Velichkov opened his own carpentry workshop. In 2014, he entered the Board of Directors of the Bulgarian Biathlon Federation.

Biathlon results
All results are sourced from the International Biathlon Union.

Olympic Games

World Championships

*During Olympic seasons competitions are only held for those events not included in the Olympic program.
**Team was added as an event in 1989.

References

External links
 Владимир Величков at the Bulgarian Biathlon Federation  (English translation)
 
 

1959 births
Living people
Bulgarian male biathletes
Biathletes at the 1980 Winter Olympics
Biathletes at the 1984 Winter Olympics
Biathletes at the 1988 Winter Olympics
Olympic biathletes of Bulgaria
People from Ihtiman
Sportspeople from Sofia Province
20th-century Bulgarian people
21st-century Bulgarian people